City Express, also known as Air Atonabee Ltd., was an airline based in Ontario, Canada, from 1971 to 1991, which operated passenger services in eastern Canada and the northeastern United States.

History 
City Express was founded by Joseph Csumrik in 1971 as Atonabee Airways based at Peterborough Airport in Peterborough, Ontario. It began scheduled service in 1975. In 1980 the company was renamed to Air Atonabee Ltd.

In 1984, Air Atonabee was acquired by Victor Pappalardo and reorganized into City Express. The airline relocated its base to Toronto Island Airport (now Billy Bishop Toronto City Airport) (YTZ) where it began STOL service. 

City Express ceased operations in February 1991.

Destinations
Destinations included:

 Montreal - Montréal-Pierre Elliott Trudeau International Airport / Montreal-Mirabel International Airport
 Ottawa - Ottawa Macdonald–Cartier International Airport
 Quebec City - Québec City Jean Lesage International Airport
 New York/Newark - Newark Liberty International Airport
 Detroit 
 London, Ontario - London International Airport
 Sept-Îles, Quebec
 Wabush/Labrador City, NL

Fleet 
 4  De Havilland Canada Dash 8
 4  de Havilland Canada Dash 7
 9  Saunders ST-27

See also 
 List of defunct airlines of Canada

References

External links 

Air Atonabee at Planespotters.net

Airlines established in 1971
Defunct companies of Ontario
Defunct airlines of Canada
Airlines disestablished in 1991
Transport in Peterborough, Ontario
Canadian companies established in 1971
1971 establishments in Ontario
1991 disestablishments in Ontario